Gergely Bobál (born 31 August 1995) is a Hungarian football player who plays for Mezőkövesd on loan from Vasas. He was also part of the Hungarian U-19 at the 2014 UEFA European Under-19 Championship.

Club career
On 29 August 2022, Bobál joined Mezőkövesd on a season-long loan.

Club statistics

Updated to games played as of 27 June 2020.

References

External links
 MLSZ
 

1995 births
People from Pásztó
Sportspeople from Nógrád County
Living people
Hungarian footballers
Hungary youth international footballers
Hungary under-21 international footballers
Association football forwards
Budapest Honvéd FC players
Gyirmót FC Győr players
VfL Wolfsburg II players
Zalaegerszegi TE players
Csákvári TK players
C.D. Nacional players
Vasas SC players
Mezőkövesdi SE footballers
Nemzeti Bajnokság I players
Nemzeti Bajnokság II players
Regionalliga players
Primeira Liga players
Hungarian expatriate footballers
Expatriate footballers in Germany
Hungarian expatriate sportspeople in Germany
Expatriate footballers in Portugal
Hungarian expatriate sportspeople in Portugal